Vostok Station (meaning "Station East") is a Russian research station in inland Princess Elizabeth Land, Antarctica. Research includes ice core drilling and magnetometry. Vostok (Russian for "east") was named after Vostok, the lead ship of the First Russian Antarctic Expedition captained by Fabian von Bellingshausen. The Bellingshausen Station was named after this captain (the second ship, Mirny, captained by Mikhail Lazarev, became the namesake for Mirny Station).

Description

Vostok is located near the Southern Pole of Inaccessibility and the South Geomagnetic Pole, making it one of the optimal places to observe changes in the Earth's magnetosphere. Other studies include actinometry, geophysics, medicine and climatology.

The station was supplied from Mirny Station on the Antarctic coast. The station normally hosts 30 scientists and engineers in the summer. In winter, their number drops to 15.

The only permanent research station located farther south is the Amundsen–Scott South Pole Station, operated by the United States at the geographic South Pole. The Chinese Kunlun Station is farther south than Vostok but is occupied only during summers.

Some of the challenges faced by those living on the station were described in Vladimir Sanin's books such as Newbie in the Antarctic (1973), 72 Degrees Below Zero (1975), and others.

History 

Vostok Station was established on 16 December 1957 (during the International Geophysical Year) by the 2nd Soviet Antarctic Expedition and was operated year-round for more than 37 years. The station was temporarily closed from January 1962 to January 1963, from February to November 1994, and during the winter of 2003.

In 1959, the Vostok station was the scene of a fight between two scientists over a game of chess. When one of them lost the game, he became so enraged that he attacked the other with an ice axe. According to some sources, it was a murder, though other sources say that the attack was not fatal. Afterwards, chess games were banned at Soviet, and later Russian, Antarctic stations.

In 1974, when British scientists in Antarctica performed an airborne ice-penetrating radar survey and detected strange radar readings at the site, the presence of a liquid, freshwater lake below the ice did not instantly spring to mind. In 1991, Jeff Ridley, a remote-sensing specialist with the Mullard Space Science Laboratory at University College London, directed a European satellite called ERS-1 to turn its high-frequency array toward the center of the Antarctic ice cap. It confirmed the 1974 discovery, but it was not until 1993 that the discovery was published in the Journal of Glaciology. Space-based radar revealed that the sub-glacial body of fresh water was one of the largest lakes in the world – and one of some 140 subglacial lakes in Antarctica. Russian and British scientists delineated the lake in 1996 by integrating a variety of data, including airborne ice-penetrating radar imaging observations and spaceborne radar altimetry.

In 2019, the Russian government began construction on a new, modern station building to replace the aging facilities. Construction of the new facility was completed in St. Petersburg, to be transported to Vostok Station by ship, but continuing delays have pushed back completion of the new station to no earlier than 2023.

Historic monuments
Vostok Station Tractor: Heavy tractor АТ-Т 11, which participated in the first traverse to the South Geomagnetic Pole, along with a plaque to commemorate the opening of the station in 1957, has been designated a Historic Site or Monument (HSM 11) following a proposal by Russia to the Antarctic Treaty Consultative Meeting.

It was built in the summer season of 1983–1984. Under the leadership of Professor Boris Kudryashov, ancient ice core samples were obtained. The building has been designated a Historic Site or Monument (HSM 88), following a proposal by Russia to the Antarctic Treaty Consultative Meeting.

Climate

Vostok Station has an ice cap climate (EF), with subzero temperatures year round, typical as with much of Antarctica. Annual precipitation is only  (all occurring as snow), making it one of the driest places on Earth. On average, Vostok station receives 26 days of snow per year. It is also one of the sunniest places on Earth, despite having no sunshine at all between May and August; there are more hours of sunshine per year than even the sunniest places in South Africa, Australia and the Arabian Peninsula, where they approach those of the Sahara in Northern Africa. Vostok has the highest sunshine total for any calendar month on Earth, at an average of 708.8 hours of sunshine in December, or 22.9 hours daily. It also has the lowest sunshine for any calendar month, with an absolute maximum of 0 hours of sunshine per month during polar night.
 
Of official weather stations that are currently in operation, Vostok is the coldest on earth in terms of mean annual temperature. However, it has been disputed that Vostok Station is the coldest known location on earth. The now inactive Plateau Station, located on the central Antarctic plateau, is believed to have recorded an average yearly temperature that was consistently lower than that of Vostok Station during the 37-month period that it was active in the late 1960s, and satellite readings have routinely detected colder temperatures in areas between Dome A and Dome F. The most recent record set was the October record low, set on 1 October 2021.

 

Vostok is one of the coldest places on Earth.

Lower temperatures occurred higher up towards the summit of the ice sheet as temperature decreases with height along the surface.

In addition to the extremely cold temperatures, other factors make Vostok one of the most difficult places on Earth for human habitation:
An almost complete lack of moisture in the air.
A higher ionization of the air.
A polar night that lasts approximately 120 days, from late April to mid-September, including 85 continuous days of civil polar night (i.e. too dark to read, during which the sun is more than 6 degrees below the horizon.)

Ice core drilling 

These have been used to study the oxygen isotope composition of the ice, which showed that ice of the last glacial period was present below about 400 metres' depth. Then three more holes were drilled: in 1984, Hole 3G reached a final depth of 2202 m; in 1990, Hole 4G reached a final depth of 2546 m; and in 1993 Hole 5G reached a depth of 2755 m; after a brief closure, drilling continued during the winter of 1995. In 1996 it was stopped at depth 3623 m, by the request of the Scientific Committee on Antarctic Research that expressed worries about possible contamination of Lake Vostok. This ice core, drilled collaboratively with the French, produced a record of past environmental conditions stretching back 420,000 years and covering four previous glacial periods. For a long time it was the only core to cover several glacial cycles; but in 2004 it was exceeded by the EPICA core, which, whilst shallower, covers a longer time span. In 2003 drilling was permitted to continue, but was halted at the estimated distance to the lake of only 130 m.

The ancient lake was finally breached on 5 February 2012 when scientists stopped drilling at the depth of 3,770 metres and reached the surface of the sub-glacial lake.

The brittle zone is approximately between 250 and 750 m and corresponds to the Last Glacial Maximum, with the end of the Holocene climatic optimum at or near the 250-metre depth.

Although the Vostok core reached a depth of 3623 m the usable climatic information does not extend down this far. The very bottom of the core is ice refrozen from the waters of Lake Vostok and contains no climate information. The usual data sources give proxy information down to a depth of 3310 m or 414,000 years. Below this there is evidence of ice deformation.  It has been suggested that the Vostok record may be extended down to 3345 m or 436,000 years, to include more of the interesting MIS11 period, by inverting a section of the record. This then produces a record in agreement with the newer, longer EPICA record, although it provides no new information.

See also 

 Crime in Antarctica
 List of Antarctic research stations
 List of Antarctic field camps
 List of airports in Antarctica
 Lake Vostok
 Soviet Antarctic Expedition
 Vostok traverse
 Concordia Station
 Amundsen–Scott South Pole Station

References

External links

 Official website Arctic and Antarctic Research Institute 
 Vostok Station page
 Vostok average temperature data
 Vostok current met data
 Antarctic Connection article on Vostok Station
 COMNAP Antarctic Facilities
 COMNAP Antarctic Facilities Map

Outposts of Antarctica
Princess Elizabeth Land
Russia and the Antarctic
Soviet Union and the Antarctic
Historic Sites and Monuments of Antarctica
1957 establishments in Antarctica
Weather extremes of Earth